J. Stuart Wells House, now the Ernest H. Parsons Funeral Home, is a historic home located at Binghamton in Broome County, New York, USA. It was built in 1867-1870 and designed by the noted New York State architect Isaac G. Perry. It is a -story brick dwelling on a cut stone foundation and topped by a hipped, cross-gabled roof. It was expanded in the 1940s-1950s and features a wrap-around porch. Also on the property is a 2-story brick carriage house.

It was listed on the National Register of Historic Places in 2009.

References

External links

Houses in Binghamton, New York
Houses completed in 1870
Houses on the National Register of Historic Places in New York (state)
National Register of Historic Places in Broome County, New York
Historic American Buildings Survey in New York (state)